Marko Perković (born 30 August 1991) is a Croatian footballer who plays for Hungarian side MTK Budapest II as a defender.

Career statistics

Club

References

External links
 
 
 
 

1991 births
Living people
People from Slavonski Brod
Association football defenders
Croatian footballers
Croatian expatriate footballers
HNK Cibalia players
NK Radomlje players
NK Krško players
Knattspyrnufélagið Víkingur players
RNK Split players
NK Široki Brijeg players
NK Brežice 1919 players
NK Olimpija Ljubljana (2005) players
MTK Budapest FC players
First Football League (Croatia) players
Slovenian PrvaLiga players
Úrvalsdeild karla (football) players
Premier League of Bosnia and Herzegovina players
Slovenian Second League players
Nemzeti Bajnokság I players
Expatriate footballers in Belgium
Expatriate footballers in Slovenia
Expatriate footballers in Iceland
Expatriate footballers in Bosnia and Herzegovina
Expatriate footballers in Hungary
Croatian expatriate sportspeople in Belgium
Croatian expatriate sportspeople in Slovenia
Croatian expatriate sportspeople in Iceland
Croatian expatriate sportspeople in Bosnia and Herzegovina
Croatian expatriate sportspeople in Hungary